Veeeeeeeeery Edmond (TC: 太太！太太！) is a Cantopop album by Edmond Leung.

Track listing
Disc 1
Mrs! Mrs! (太太！太太！)
Overnight (一夜之間)
Human Disqualification (人間失格)
The World Is So K (全世界這麼K)
Love Me Now (現在就愛我)

Disc 2
You and Me (你和我)
June Day (六月天)
Ruqirusu (如泣如訴)
Paradise Lost (失樂園)
Long Term Relationship (細水長流)

Charts

External links

Edmond Leung albums
1999 albums